Bule may refer to:

People
 Bule Naipi (1922–1944), Albanian hero
 Jeffery Bule (born 1991), Solomon Islands football player
 Nino Bule (born 1976), Croatian football player and manager

Other
 Bule (woreda), Ethiopia
 Bule (term), Indonesian word